Vellamdam is a village in Thoothukudi district in Tamil Nadu. It is situated 4 kilometers away from Nazareth, 32 kilometers away from Tirunelveli and 41 kilometers away from Thoothukudi.

Geography 
The village has a big lake which provides water for irrigation. Due to availability of water resources and fertile land, agriculture is widely practiced .Crops such as Paddy, Banana, Ground Nut and Urad dal are cultivated here.

Administration

Transportation

Road 
Mela Vellamadam is connected with Nazareth, Theripanai, Chinnamadan Kudiyiruppu and Udaiyarkulam with Other District Roads (O.D.R). Some Government Town buses and Private buses bound to Nazareth, Srivaikuntam, Eral, Salaiputhur, Peikulam and Kayalpatnnam are available from here at fixed timings.

Railway 
The nearest railway stations are Nazareth (4 kilometres) and Alwar Thirunagari  (6 kilometres) . Daily passenger trains from Tiruchendur, Thoothukudi and Tirunelveli halt in these stations. The only express train, which halts in Nazareth, is the Chendur Express.

The nearest important railway station is Tirunelveli Junction (35 kilometres).

Air 
The nearest airports are

 Tuticorin Airport ( 28 kilometres )
 Trivandrum international airport ( approximately 160 kilometres ) and
 Madurai Airport ( approximately 170 kilometres)

Education 
There is a Government run middle school in the village.

For higher education purposes, people here depend on Higher secondary schools and colleges in Nazareth and other surrounding towns.

See also 
 Thirukkolur
 Nazareth
 Alwarthirunagari

References 

Villages in Thoothukudi district